Sunset Tan is an American reality television on E!, which debuted on May 28, 2007. The series chronicles the lives of the managers and employees of a tanning salon in Los Angeles called Sunset Tan. On April 3, 2008, E! renewed the series for a second and final season. Despite fair ratings, a third season was never ordered.

Synopsis
An ongoing theme throughout the show is competition between employees, specifically the battle to be selected by Devin and Jeff as the manager of the new Las Vegas salon, located at Palms Casino Resort. Janelle is ultimately selected for the position. By the end of the first season, Holly and Molly (The Olly Girls) are allegedly fired after throwing a party at Jeff's house while he was out of town. However, at the beginning of the second season after the girls have a meeting with Devin and Jeff, the two decide to rehire them.

Cast
Devin Haman, one of the founders and owners of the Sunset Tan salon. 
Jeff Bozz, one of the founders and owners of the Sunset Tan salon.
"The Olly Girls", aka company promoters Holly Huddleston and Molly Shea.
Erin Tietsort, manager of the Santa Monica store, originally from Oklahoma.
Nick D'Anna, the manager of the West Hollywood store.
Janelle Perry, manager of the Santa Monica store, and eventually the Las Vegas location.
Keely Williams, West L.A. manager.
Adam Ouf, sales employee.
Ania Migdal, Nick's girlfriend and sales associate.
Heidi Cortez, the new girl joining Sunset Tan who previously opened her own salon in Reno.  Heidi is a successful model, author & radio host.  Controversy arose as her fellow cast members question whether or not she is qualified for the job.  She quits Sunset Tan in the beginning of Season 2.

Guest appearances

Celebrity guests have included:
Traci Bingham
Jessica Canseco, ex-wife of José Canseco
Chelsea Handler
Jenna Jameson
Kato Kaelin
Maria Kanellis,  WWE Diva 
Chris Kattan
Kim Kardashian, star of E!'s Keeping Up with the Kardashians.
Mario Lopez
Candice Michelle, Former WWE Diva
Tito Ortiz, mixed martial artist and boyfriend of Jenna Jameson.
Daniel Puder
Shauna Sand-Lamas, Playboy Playmate and ex-wife of Lorenzo Lamas.
Pauly Shore
Karina Smirnoff
Britney Spears
Eve Torres WWE diva
Maryse Ouellet, WWE Diva

Episodes

Season 1 (2007)

Season 2 (2008)

Home releases
The complete first season of Sunset Tan on DVD was released by Lionsgate on Region 1 DVD on August 5, 2008. Both seasons have been released uncensored by Shock Records in Australia. The show was also available to download on iTunes and Amazon on October 30, 2007.

References

External links
Sunset Tan Homepage

Fan Website
The sexiest place to work in Vegas? Sunset Tan co-founder Devin Haman talks drama and skin

2000s American reality television series
2007 American television series debuts
2008 American television series endings
English-language television shows
E! original programming
Television shows set in Los Angeles